A stagecoach is a four-wheeled horse-drawn transport.

Stagecoach may also refer to:

Places in the United States
 Stagecoach, Colorado, a short-lived ski resort
 Stagecoach, Nevada, an unincorporated community
 Stagecoach, Texas, a town
 Stagecoach Dam, on the Yampa river in Colorado
 Stagecoach State Park, Colorado
 Stagecoach State Recreation Area, Nebraska

Film and television
 Stagecoach (1939 film), a John Ford film starring John Wayne
 Stagecoach (1966 film), a remake of the 1939 film
 Stagecoach (1986 film), a television remake of the 1939 film
 Stagecoach: The Texas Jack Story, a 2016 Canadian Western

Music
 Stagecoach (band), a band from London, England
 Stagecoach Ballroom, a hony-tonk venue in Fort Worth, Texas
 Stagecoach Festival, an annual country music festival held in Indio, California, U.S.

Other uses
 Stagecoach Fire, an August, 2020, wildfire in Kern County, California
 Stagecoach Group, a transport operator based in Perth, Scotland, UK
 Stagecoach Hotel & Casino, in Beatty, Nevada, U.S.
 Stagecoach Inn (disambiguation)
 Stagecoach Theatre Arts, a theatre arts school, headquartered in Walton-on-Thames, England, UK
 Stagecoach Trail, a road in Illinois, U.S.
 Mary Fields (c. 1832–1914), nicknamed "Stagecoach", first African-American woman star route mail carrier

See also
 Stagecoach Express (disambiguation)
 Acting coach or stage coach, a stage acting instructor